Hazel Eileen Edwards (OAM) (born 1945) is an Australian author of children's literature, including There's a Hippopotamus on Our Roof Eating Cake (1980).

Early life and education
Melbourne-born and based, Hazel Eileen Edwards attended Ashburton Primary and Camberwell High School, graduating in 1961.

Career
After working in a bank and studying at night, Edwards entered Toorak Teachers' College. She taught at Westall High School and was invited to lecture at Frankston Teachers' College while studying at Monash University at night. Later she lectured in children's literature and psychology at Toorak Teachers' College, and the Institute of Early Childhood Development, then became a freelance author-lecturer after the publication of  'General Store' (1977) and There's a Hippopotamus On Our Roof Eating Cake (1980) which toured nationally with Garry Ginivan productions as 'Hippo Hippo the Musical' (2016).

As 2001 Australian Antarctic Division writer, awarded the Antarctic Fellowship, Edwards travelled to Casey Station, Antarctica on the Polar Bird. Literary output based on her experience includes Antarctica's Frozen Chosen (a young adult eco-thriller), Antarctic Writer on Ice (her expedition diary), Antarctic Dad (a picture book), Right or Wrong (a play co-written with fellow author Goldie Alexander), Grandma Leaps the Antarctic (an Auslan-signed DVD) and Antarctic Closeup, a National Museum initiative.

Edwards was a 2012 National Year of Reading Ambassador, and has been a director on the Australian Society of Authors’ board.

In 2010, Edwards wrote the young adult novel f2m; the boy within with co-author Ryan Kennedy about transitioning from female to male. In 2018, she launched her book Like Me about a child involved in the Yarra Plenty Regional Library's literacy program "Doggy Tales". Her 2016 novel Hijabi Girl, co-written with Ooze Allan, is about a diverse group of school friends in modern Australia, and has been turned into a musical puppet show.

Awards and honours
 2013 Order of Australia Medal for services to literature
 2017 YABBA Graham Davey citation for mentoring  young readers and writers

Published works

Cake Eating Hippo series
 'Ho!Ho!Ho! There's a Hippopotamus on Our Roof Eating Christmas Cake'
There's a Hippopotamus on our Roof Eating Cake
 "Hooray! There's a Hippopotamus on Our Roof Having a Birthday Party"
 Hand Me Down Hippo chapter book
 My Hippopotamus is on our Caravan Roof Getting Sunburnt
 Hey Hippopotamus, Do Babies Eat Cake
 Look, There's a Hippopotamus in the Playground Eating Cake
 Guess What? There's A Hippopotamus on the Hospital Roof Eating Cake
 Our Cake Eating Hippo Plays
  Pocket Bonfire Productions 16-minute film There's a Hippopotamus on Our Roof Eating Cake

Antarctic related works
 Antarctic Dad' Kipas Books re-issue 2018
 Antarctica's Frozen Chosen Antarctic Writer on Ice Right or Wrong? Plays that make you think Antarctic Closeup in Making Tracks'' series

Works in collections
 Lu Rees Archives (University of Canberra)
 Munich, Germany, International Youth Library which contains books promoting tolerance, including Edwards' titles
 Astrid Lindgren Memorial Award (ALMA)

References

External links
 

1945 births
Living people
Australian children's writers
Australian non-fiction writers
Australian women children's writers